Grand Nomenon (3,488m) is a mountain of the Graian Alps in Aosta Valley, Italy.

Despite being a fine pyramidal peak in its own right, Grand Nomenon lives somewhat in the shadow of its giant southern neighbour Grivola. The summit however provides a fantastic panorama and climbs usually start from the Cogne Valley to the north.

References

Mountains of Aosta Valley
Mountains of the Graian Alps
Alpine three-thousanders